The 31st Mechanized Infantry Brigade "Kamia" is a mechanized infantry brigade of the Hellenic Army, headquartered in Feres and subordinated to the 12th Mechanized Infantry Division.

Structure 
31st Mechanized Infantry Brigade "Kamia"
 HQ Company (ΙΣΤ)
 31st Signal Company (31 ΛΔΒ)
 31st Engineer Company (31 ΛΜΧ)
 12th Armored Battalion (12 ΕΜΑ)
 534th Infantry Battalion (534 ΤΠ)
 535th Mechanized Infantry Battalion (535 M/K ΤΠ)
 536th Mechanized Infantry Battalion (536 M/K ΤΠ)
 110th Self Propelled Artillery Battalion (110 Μ Α/K ΠΒ)
 31st Antitank Company (31 ΛΑΤ)
 31st Support Battalion (31 ΤΥΠ)

References

Mechanized infantry brigades of Greece
Evros (regional unit)